Rowshanaq (also known as Rowshanak) is a village in Balghelu Rural District, in the Central District of Ardabil County, Ardabil Province, Iran. At the 2006 census, its population was 248, in 48 families.

References 

Towns and villages in Ardabil County